620 Drakonia is a minor planet orbiting the Sun. It was discovered October 26, 1906, in Taunton, Massachusetts, by American astronomer Joel Hastings Metcalf and given the preliminary designation 1906 WE. It may have been named for Drake University.

Photometric observations at the Palmer Divide Observatory in Colorado Springs, Colorado, in 2001 were used to build a light curve for this object. The asteroid displayed a rotation period of 5.49 ± 0.01 hours and a brightness variation of 0.56 ± 0.02 in magnitude.

References

External links 
 Lightcurve plot of 620 Drakonia, Palmer Divide Observatory, B. D. Warner (2001)
 Asteroid Lightcurve Database (LCDB), query form (info )
 Dictionary of Minor Planet Names, Google books
 Asteroids and comets rotation curves, CdR – Observatoire de Genève, Raoul Behrend
 Discovery Circumstances: Numbered Minor Planets (1)-(5000) – Minor Planet Center
 
 

Background asteroids
Drakonia
Drakonia
E-type asteroids (Tholen)
19061026